Toy Story Hotel is one of two hotels located within Shanghai Disney Resort. The hotel is themed after the Disney•Pixar franchise of Toy Story animated films. The hotel has two sections, the Sheriff Woody wing and the Buzz Lightyear wing. The hotel, when viewed from above, looks similar to an infinity symbol. Toy Story Hotel was opened in 2016 together with the rest of the resort.

Theming
The hotel is the first hotel to be themed entirely to Toy Story. It is similar to the value resorts at Walt Disney World Resort (Disney's All Star Movies, Music, Sports, Pop Century, and Art of Animation Resorts), in that it will include oversized sculptures in its courtyard. It is most similar to the Art of Animation Resort, which is also themed after Disney•Pixar films.

References

External links

Hotels in Shanghai Disney Resort
Hotels established in 2016
Hotel buildings completed in 2016
2016 establishments in China
Hotel